Prince Tai of the Second Rank (泰郡王) was Qing dynasty princely peerage created in 1733 for Kangxi Emperor's grandson and Prince Xunqin of the Second Rank Yunti's son Hongchun.As Prince Tai of the Second Rank peerage was not granted perpetual inheritability, each successive bearer would hold diminished ranks vis-a-vis his predecessor.

Holders of the peerage 

 1723–1724, 1726—1735：Prince Tai of the Second Rank Hongchun. He was granted a title of Prince of the Fourth Rank  and stripped of his title in 1724. Restored as grace defender duke in 1726, promoted in 1728 to Prince of the Fourth Rank, promoted in 1731 to Prince of the Third Rank. In 1733 he was granted a title of Prince Tai of the Second Rank,peaceful").  then demoted to Prince of the Fourth Rank in 1734 and deprived of his titles in 1735.

Later members of the peerage 

 Hongchun (1703–1739)
 Yongxin (永信, 1720–1806), first son
 Mianshun (绵顺,1743–1748), Yongxin's son who died prematurely
 Yizhang (奕彰,1768–1836), Miandai's second son by lady Feimo adopted as a posthumous successor of Mianshun
 Zaifen (载芬 1821–1867), Yizhang's son
 Puyong (溥雍, 1843–1883), Zaifen's son
 Yuduan (毓鍴, 1887-?), Puyong's adoptive son and Pugang's biological son
 Hengji (恒纪, 1907-?), Yuduan's son
 Yongjin (永晋), Hongchun's  sixth son
 Miandai (绵代), Yongjin's eldest son
 Yihou (奕厚,1773–1856), Miandai's first son
 Yizhang, adopted as Mianshun's son
 Yiduan (奕短), died prematurely
Mianbing (绵炳,1764-1790), Yongjin's son
 Yiju (奕炬,1788-1845), Mianbing's son
Zaidou (载豆,1831-1891), Yiju's son
Pugang (溥岗,1855-?), Zaidou's son 
Yuduan, adopted by Puyong
 Mianbei (绵備), Yongjin's son
 Yishan (1790–1878), Mianbei's eldest son, held the title of a first class zhenguo jiangjun from 1847 to 1878
 Zaizhuo (载鷟), Yishan's second son, held the title of a third class fuguo jiangjun from 1851 to 1876
 Puhan (溥翰), Zaizhuo's eldest son, held the title of a third class fengguo jiangjun from 1857 to 1878, held the title of a third class fuguo jiangjun from 1878 to 1886
 Yuzhao (毓照), Puhan's third son, held the title of a third class fuguo jiangjun from 1887

References 

Qing dynasty princely peerages
Prince Tai